The Grove Hill Cemetery is a historic cemetery at 290 Main Street in Waltham, Massachusetts. Established in 1703, the cemetery was Waltham's only cemetery until 1857, when Mount Feake Cemetery opened. It was authorized in 1703, but its initial  parcel of land was not purchased until 1704. The first documented burial, however, took place in November 1703. The northwest section of the cemetery is its oldest portion, and includes a number of unmarked gravesites. The cemetery continues in active use today, and contains a representative sample of funerary art spanning 300 years. Its main entrance features posts with an Egyptian Revival theme, a style continued with the presence of obelisks dispersed on the grounds.

Two notable people are buried here. Nathaniel P. Banks (1816–1894) was a Civil War Major General and later politician. US Navy sailor Charles Gidding (1855–1943) was a peacetime Medal of Honor recipient.

The cemetery was listed on the National Register of Historic Places in 1989.

See also
 National Register of Historic Places  listings in Waltham, Massachusetts

References

External links
 

Buildings and structures in Waltham, Massachusetts
Cemeteries on the National Register of Historic Places in Massachusetts
1703 establishments in Massachusetts
Cemeteries in Middlesex County, Massachusetts
National Register of Historic Places in Waltham, Massachusetts